The Cow Creek Band of Umpqua Tribe of Indians, known to the Bureau of Indian Affairs (BIA) as the Cow Creek Band of Umpqua Indians of Oregon is a federally recognized Native American tribal government based in Roseburg, Oregon, United States. The tribe takes its name from Cow Creek, a tributary of the South Umpqua River.

History

Origins
The Cow Creek Band of Umpqua Tribe of Indians was originated as a unified entity by the Oregon Superintendent of Indian Affairs on September 19, 1853, when a treaty was signed between the United States and a group of villages located along Cow Creek, a tributary of the South Fork of the Umpqua River. In actuality several different tribal entities were included in this umbrella group, including Upper Umpqua Targunsans, Milwaletas, and possibly some Southern Molallas. No fewer than three distinct languages were spoken by the Native Americans agglomerated by the government as the "Cow Creek Band."

During the times before Western contact, the various entities of the Cow Creek band were seasonally migratory hunter-gatherers, making use of permanent winter encampments and moving their villages in pursuit of food sources during the warmer months. This changed under terms of the 1853 treaty, however, with the Cow Creek Band agreeing to cede 800 square miles of territory to the government in exchange for 21 payments totaling $12,000 and a temporary reservation located on their traditional tribal lands.

In October 1855, the Rogue River War erupted in the area and the peoples of the Cow Creek Band fled for safety in the hills, joining others there who similarly faced forced removal from their traditional homeland for concentration on the Grand Ronde Reservation located to the north. This relocation proved inevitable however, and in January 1856 the bulk of the Cow Creek Band was moved to Grand Ronde, many forced to walk beside the inadequate 8 wagons appropriated for the move. Some refused to leave, however, with half the Milwaleta people dying of starvation and exposure when they remained in the hills. Several indigenous people were shot during armed forays into the hills in search of stragglers.

The mountainous terrain near today's Canyonville provided cover for some, however, and efforts in May 1856 by Oregon Indian Agent James P. Day and in 1860 by the United States Army failed to round up remaining members of the Cow Creek Band. Volunteers periodically pursued them for the next quarter century, with members of the Cow Creek Band periodically conducting raids upon the cattle of Anglo-American settlers in an attempt to avoid starvation in a world in which traditional methods of food acquisition were no longer possible.

Claims

In 1910, the Cow Creek Band made its first attempt to regain a portion of its traditional homeland through the legislative process. A bill was passed to compensate the tribe in 1932, only to be vetoed by President Herbert Hoover.

Litigation commenced in 1936, with the Cow Creek Band a party in the case Rogue River Tribe of Indians v. United States (64 F. Supp. 339, Ct. Cl.). A second hearing was held four years later (89 F. Supp. 789, Ct. Cl.). Only two of the 17 tribes participating in these cases were successful, however, and the claim of the Cow Creek Band was dismissed.

Decades of litigation followed, marked by a series of legal defeats based on technical aspects of the law surrounding the Indian Claims Commission. This was reversed on May 26, 1980, however, when the United States Congress passed legislation paving the way for a lawsuit against the government on the basis that the amount paid by the federal government for tribal lands was unconscionably low.  On December 29, 1982, an act of Congress granted the Cow Creek Band formal tribal recognition.

The Cow Creek Band today
In the 21st Century, the Cow Creek Band of Umpqua Tribe of Indians is one of nine federally recognized tribal governments in Oregon and includes nearly 1400 members.

Among the economic ventures of the Cow Creek Band is the Seven Feathers Hotel & Casino Resort, located at Canyonville, Oregon.

See also
 List of federally recognized Native American tribes in Oregon
 Umpqua people

Footnotes

Further reading

 David R.M. Beck, "'Standing Out Here in the Surf': The Termination and Restoration of the Coos, Lower Umpqua and Siuslaw Indians of Western Oregon in Historical Perspective," Oregon Historical Quarterly, vol. 110, no. 1 (Spring 2009), pp. 6–37. In JSTOR.
 Stephen Dow Beckham, The Indians of Western Oregon: This Land Was Theirs. Coos Bay, OR: Arago Books, 1977.
 E.A. Schwartz, The Rogue River indian War and Its aftermath, 1850-1980. Norman, OK: University of Oklahoma Press, 1997.
 Michael C. Walch, "Terminating the Indian Termination Policy," Stanford Law Review, vol. 35, no. 6 (July 1983), pp. 1181–1215. In JSTOR.

External links
Cow Creek Band of Umpqua Tribe of Indians (official website)

1853 establishments in Oregon Territory
Canyonville, Oregon
Federally recognized tribes in the United States